Neschwitz, Sorbian Njeswačidło, is a municipality in the east of Saxony, Germany. It belongs to the district of Bautzen and lies 14 km northwest of the eponymous city.

The municipality is part of the recognized Sorbian settlement area in Saxony. Upper Sorbian has an official status next to German, all villages bear names in both languages.

Geography 
The municipality is situated in the Upper Lusatian flatland.

Villages 
Several villages belong to the municipality:

Neschwitz (Njeswačidło)
Caßlau (Koslow)
Doberschütz (Dobrošicy)
Holscha (Holešow)
Holschdubrau (Holešowska Dubrawka)
Kleinholscha ("Holška")
Krinitz (Króńca)
Lissahora (Liša Hora)
Loga (Łahow)
Lomske (Łomsk)
Luga (Łuh)
Neudorf (Nowa Wjes)
Pannewitz (Banecy)
Saritsch (Zarěč)
Übigau (Wbohow)
Weidlitz (Wutołčicy) and
Zescha (Šešow)

References 

Populated places in Bautzen (district)